HMS M1 was a submarine of the British Royal Navy, one of four vessels of her class ordered towards the end of the First World War. She sank with the loss of her entire crew in 1925.

The vessels were originally intended as "submarine monitors", but their purpose had been changed before detailed design began. M1 was fitted with a 12-inch (305mm) gun which was intended for use against surface ships in preference to torpedoes, the argument being that, "No case is known of a ship-of-war being torpedoed when under way at a range outside of 1000 yards [915 meters]."

It was important for the submarine's gun to sink or disable the target with the first shot, because the gun could only be loaded on the surface.

She was launched on 9 July 1917, but was not involved in active service in the First World War.

In 1923, water leaking into the barrel of the gun resulted in extensive damage to the muzzle when it was fired.

The collision tore the gun from the hull and water flooded the interior through the open loading hole. The crew members appear to have tried to escape by flooding the interior and opening the escape hatch, but their bodies were never found.

Later that year, Richard Larn and a BBC TV documentary crew visited the wreck, and the resulting film was broadcast in March 2000. The wreck is designated as a "protected place" under the Protection of Military Remains Act 1986.

References

External links

SI 2008/0950 Designation under the Protection of Military Remains Act
RN Subs 1916 - 1932: M Class

British M-class submarines
Ships built in Barrow-in-Furness
1917 ships
World War I submarines of the United Kingdom
Maritime incidents in 1925
British submarine accidents
Shipwrecks in the English Channel
Protected Wrecks of the United Kingdom
Submarines sunk in collisions
Warships lost with all hands
1925 disasters in the United Kingdom